Ying L.K. Hope P. Eng. (1923 – November 12, 2007) was a Chinese Canadian politician, Toronto Public School Board trustee and Metro Toronto Councillor and Toronto Alderman.

Hope's grandparents, great uncles and aunts emigrated from China to Victoria, British Columbia in the 1880s as part of a wave of Chinese immigrants working on the railway and in mines. His father and uncle established "Wo Hope Tailoring" ("peace and unity" in Chinese). Though the family's surname was Low, it was assumed by the doctor delivering Hope's eldest brother that the family surname was Hope so it is that name that was put on all of his siblings birth certificates, and his.

He left Canada in 1946 to study engineering at the University of Washington, earned his degree, and settled in Toronto.  He was elected to as a trustee to the Toronto Board of Education in 1964 and elected chair in 1968. He was elected an alderman on Toronto City Council in the 1969 municipal election representing Ward 5. He remained on council until he was defeated in the 1985 municipal election by Ron Kanter. He won a seat as a Metro Councillor representing Midtown Ward in a 1987 by-election but was defeated the next year, in the 1988 election, by Ila Bossons. He attempted to return to council again in the 1991 election but was defeated by John Adams in Ward 13 by a narrow margin of 747 votes.

Hope also ran for office at other levels. In the 1967 provincial election he was the Ontario Progressive Conservative candidate in Riverdale placing second to James Renwick of the Ontario New Democratic Party. Decades later he ran for a seat in the House of Commons of Canada in the 1984 federal election as a Progressive Conservative but placed third in the riding of Spadina which included the Ward 5 Toronto seat he represented on city council.

After leaving politics, Hope continued his activity with the Chinese community as an advocate for reparations for the Chinese head tax. He worked as a consultant for Environment Canada's "green plan" in the early 1990s and pursued a career as a real estate agent.

Hope died at Sunnybrook Health Sciences Centre in Toronto on November 12, 2007. He was survived by his second wife Audrey and children Judy, Michael, and Madeline, from his first marriage to Alice Hope.

Electoral record (partial)

References

External links
 Ying L.K. Hope, 84: Head-tax apology his crowning triumph
 From the head tax to hope

1923 births
2007 deaths
Metropolitan Toronto councillors
Canadian politicians of Chinese descent
Toronto city councillors
Toronto District School Board trustees
Progressive Conservative Party of Canada candidates for the Canadian House of Commons
Candidates in the 1984 Canadian federal election